Carol Lowery Delaney (born December 12, 1940) is an American anthropologist and author.

Delaney earned an A.B. in philosophy from Boston University in 1962, an M.T.S. from Harvard Divinity School in 1976, and her Ph.D. in cultural anthropology from the University of Chicago in 1984.

Anthropological work
She specializes in the anthropological sub-discipline of cultural anthropology, focusing on gender and religion.  Her original anthropological fieldwork was conducted in Turkey from 1979-1982. Additional fieldwork was conducted in Belgium, 1984–85, among Turkish immigrants. Recent research has focused on the religious beliefs of Christopher Columbus.

Delaney was Assistant Director of the Center for the Study of World Religions, Harvard University, 1985-87.  At Stanford University, she was Assistant Professor of Anthropology, 1987-1995; Associate Professor, 1995-2005; Emerita, 2005.  At Brown University, she was Visiting Professor in Religious Studies, 2006 and 2007. From 2007 to the present, she served as a Research Scholar in that department and is also an Invited Research Scholar at the John Carter Brown Library at Brown University.

Bibliography
The Seed and The Soil: Gender and Cosmology in Turkish Village Society. Berkeley: University of California Press, 1991.
Naturalizing Power: Essays in Feminist Cultural Analysis. Co-edited with Sylvia Yanagisako. New York: Routledge Press, 1995.
Abraham on Trial: The Social Legacy of Biblical Myth.  Princeton: Princeton University Press, 1998. Finalist for National Jewish Book Award [category: Scholarship]; also a special mention for Victor Turner Prize of the Society for Humanistic Anthropology and inspiration for an opera of the same title by Andrew Lovett.
Tohum ve Toprak Turkish translation, of The Seed and the Soil, with new introductory essay.  Istanbul: IletisimYayinlari, 2001. Second printing, 2009.
Investigating Culture: An Experiential Introduction to Anthropology. Oxford: Blackwell Publishers.  2003 in UK;  2004 in US.  Second, revised edition, with Deborah Kaspin, 2011.
Columbus and the Quest for Jerusalem.  New York: Free Press/Simon and Schuster, 2011.  One of  “Best Books of 2011,” Times Literary Supplement. December 2, 2011.

Selected articles
 "Columbus’s Ultimate Goal: Jerusalem."
 “Untangling the Meanings of Hair in Turkish Village Society.” 
 "The Hajj: Sacred and Secular."
 "The Meaning of Paternity and the Virgin Birth Debate."

Fellowships and awards
 National Endowment for the Humanities, John Carter Brown Library at Brown University, 2004–05
 Fellow, Center for Advanced Study in the Behavioral Sciences, Stanford University, 1996–97
 Fellow, Harvard Divinity School, 1992–93
 Fellow, Stanford Humanities Center, 1989–90
 Mark Perry Galler prize for the most distinguished dissertation in the social sciences at the University of Chicago, 1985.
 Fulbright Advanced Research Fellowship, 1984–85
 Fulbright-Hays Dissertation Fellowship, 1981–82
 National Science Foundation, Dissertation Grant, 1981–82
 Fulbright Cultural Exchange Scholar, 1979–80

References

External links
 Carol Delaney's website
 Carol Delaney's Author page
 Interview with John Shuck about Columbus and the Quest for Jerusalem
 Interview with John Shuck about Abraham on Trial

Boston University College of Arts and Sciences alumni
American women anthropologists
Living people

1940 births
Harvard Divinity School alumni
University of Chicago alumni
Boston University alumni
21st-century American women